Telesio Interlandi (20 October 1894 – 15 January 1965) was an Italian journalist and propagandist. He was one of the leading advocates of antisemitism in Fascist Italy.

Born in Chiaramonte Gulfi, Interlandi took his degree in law and became a journalist, writing for such papers as Il Travaso delle idee (from 1919), La Nazione (from 1921), Impero (from 1923) before joining Il Tevere in 1924. Under Interlandi, this paper became the first distributor of anti-Semitic propaganda in the mainstream Italian press. In this respect he became associated with Roberto Farinacci and Giovanni Preziosi and helped to promulgate their anti-Semitic views. An important figure within the National Fascist Party, Interlandi was the director of the Fascist Federation of the Italian Press and head of the Fascist Journalist Association.

Interlandi was a devotee of racialism and believed that the concept of race was central to the fascist national revolution and this was the root of his strong anti-semitism. He founded two journals, Il Quadrivio in 1934 and La Difesa della Razza in 1938, both noted not only for their anti-semitism but also for their admiration of Nazism. Such was the strength of Interlandi's hatred of the Jews that he was even personally told by Benito Mussolini to moderate his language.

Interlandi continued to write following the establishment of the Republic of Salò, mainly for Giovanni Preziosi's Vita Italiana journal. He also briefly served as propaganda chief for the puppet state. Following the war, he was not imprisoned, but was deprived of his property and disappeared from public view. He had no direct involvement with the Italian Social Movement, but his writings were an important ideological influence on Giorgio Almirante.

References

1894 births
1965 deaths
Writers from the Province of Ragusa
Antisemitism in Italy
Italian fascists
Journalists from Sicily
Italian male journalists
20th-century Italian journalists
20th-century Italian male writers
Italian magazine founders